Cleve Rugby Football Club is an English amateur rugby union club founded in 1922 and based in Mangotsfield, Bristol. The club play in the seventh-tier of the English league system; Tribute Western Counties North. They are a member of the Bristol and District Rugby Football Combination, an organisation which promotes junior rugby union in the city of Bristol.

History
Cleve Rugby Football Club was formed in 1922 as “Cleve RFC Downend”. They played their first game in a field in Staple Hill, which is now Staple Hill Park. The club later moved to Vassells Park in Fishponds, the players changing in the back room of the Full Moon Public House. It was at this time that the club became known simply as “Cleve RFC”. The club purchased a wooden pavilion in November 1934 for £200. When Cleve were forced to move to Bromley Heath Road in Downend in 1939, because of a housing development, their wooden pavilion went with them. In 1947 further land was purchased and was farmed by club members, as a source of income. Eventually, to meet the growing local interest in rugby football, more pitches were developed. Then, between 1969 and 1971, members added more facilities, which carried the club through the next 25 years.

The club badge is based on the coat of arms of the Cave Estate, from whom the ground in Downend was purchased and the ears of wheat acknowledge the club’s farming activity after the War. The club motto ‘We sow to reap’ also records these early events but also reflects the club’s commitment to providing rugby facilities and coaching for children from the age of 6.

The next milestone in Cleve’s history was the club’s move to its new clubhouse and grounds in Mangotsfield named ‘The Hayfields’ in September 1997. The club runs three senior sides on Saturdays and all mini and junior levels, from under-7’s to colts.

Honours
 Bristol Combination Cup winners (3): 1980, 1983, 1985, 2013
 Gloucester 1 champions: 1994–95
 Western Counties North champions: 2000–01
 South West Division 2 East champions: 2005–06
 South West 1 West champions: 2014–15

Coaching staff
1st XV : Nathan Huntley  Paul Vinicombe  

2nd XV : Simon Clarke 

3rd XV : Mark Jones 

 Colts Coach:

Club officials

President : Howard Owen

Chairman  : Simon Wilstead

Vice Chairman  :Lee Williams

Director of Rugby  Adam Shepherd
 
Hon Secretary : Steve Bracey

Hon Treasurer : Tim Sperrings

Hon Match Secretary : Fred Stapleton

Notable former players
 Ryan Davis – London Wasps
 James Phillips – Exeter Chiefs
 Chris Brooker – Bristol
 Redford Pennycook – Ealing Trailfinders
 Chevvy Pennycook – Moseley/Bristol 
 Jack Tovey – Bristol

References

English rugby union teams
Rugby clubs established in 1922
Rugby union in Bristol